Soto de la Vega is a municipality located in the province of León, Castile and León, Spain. According to the 2007 census (INE), the municipality has a population of 1,888 inhabitants.

See also
 Tierra de La Bañeza
 Leonese language
 Kingdom of León

References

Municipalities in the Province of León
Tierra de La Bañeza